The Iceland national under-17 football team represents Iceland in international football at this age level and is controlled by Knattspyrnusamband Íslands (KSÍ), the governing body for football in Iceland.

History in the UEFA European Under-17 Championship
Between 1982-2019 this was an under-16 championship.

Current squad
 The following players were called up for the 2023 UEFA European Under-17 Championship qualification matches.
 Match dates: 25-31 October 2022
 Opposition: ,  and Caps and goals correct as of:''' 20 August 2022, after the match against

See also
 Iceland national football team
 Iceland national under-21 football team
 Iceland national under-19 football team
 Iceland women's national football team

References

Under-17
European national under-17 association football teams